The International Luge Federation  (French: Fédération Internationale de Luge de Course (FIL); German: Internationaler Rennrodelverband) is the main international federation for all luge sports. Founded by 13 nations at Davos, Switzerland in 1957, it has members of 53 national luge associations  and is based in Berchtesgaden, Germany. In reaction to the 2022 Russian invasion of Ukraine, in March 2022 the FIL banned all Russian athletes, coaches, and officials from its events, suspended all Russian officials appointed to its Commissions and Working Groups, and deemed Russia ineligible to host any of its events.

History

Early beginnings
The first luge competition took place on February 12, 1883, on a four-kilometer course between Davos and Klosters, Switzerland, with the co-winners from Australia and Switzerland having a time of 9 minutes, 15 seconds. Austria, Germany, and Switzerland founded the Internationaler Schlittensportsverband (ISSV - International Sled Sport Federation ) in 1913 in Dresden, Germany. The first European Luge Championships took place in Reichenberg, Bohemia (now Liberec, Czech Republic) in 1914. World War I in Europe caused the ISSV operations to be suspended and prevented any additional competitions until 1927.

Rebirth and merging into FIBT
In 1927, the ISSV was reestablished with the second European Luge Championships taking place in Schreiberhau, Germany (now Szklarska Poręba, Poland) the following year with a women's competition included. The ISSV was absorbed into the Fédération Internationale de Bobsleigh et de Tobogganing (FIBT - International Bobsleigh and Tobagganing Federation ) in 1935 and was part of the "Section de Luge" until the early 1950s.

Independence from FIBT
At a 1954 International Olympic Committee (IOC) meeting in Athens, Greece, it was determined that luge would replace skeleton as a Winter Olympic discipline. Skeleton, which had been a sport both at the 1928 and 1948 Winter Olympics, would not return as an Olympic sport until the 2002 Winter Olympics in Salt Lake City. In 1955, the first World Luge Championships were held at Holmenkollen near Oslo, Norway. The FIL was established in Switzerland in 1957 with membership granted into the IOC at their congress in Sofia, Bulgaria that same year. Bert Isatitsch of Austria was elected President of the FIL.

FIL growth
At the 1959 IOC meeting in Munich, West Germany, luge was approved for inclusion into the 1964 Winter Olympics in Innsbruck with competitions taking place in neighboring Igls. 12 nations took part in the first Winter Olympic luge competitions with timing taking place in 1/100ths of a second. Following a tie in the men's doubles competition between East Germany and Italy at the 1972 Winter Olympics in Sapporo, Japan, the FIL began timing all of their competition in 1/1000ths of a second, a practice that continues as of 2009. The first natural track European championships took place in Kapfenberg, Austria in 1970 while the first natural track World Championships took place in Inzing, Austria in 1979. The first Junior World Championships on artificial track took place at Lake Placid, New York, United States three years later.

FIL today
Isatitich died suddenly on February 8, 1994, and then Vice-President for Sport Josef Fendt took over as Acting President. Fendt would be named president at the FIL congress in Rome, Italy later that year, a position he held until 2020.

In reaction to the 2022 Russian invasion of Ukraine, in March 2022 the FIL banned all Russian athletes, coaches, and officials from its events, suspended all Russian officials appointed to its Commissions and Working Groups, and deemed Russia ineligible to host any of its events. Also in response to the Russian invasion of Ukraine, Russian Luge Federation's Natalia Gart was expelled from the FIL Executive Board.

FIL events

The FIL governs competitions on artificial tracks and natural tracks at both the European and World Championship levels. At the Winter Olympics, only artificial track competitions are contested. The events at the European and World Championships are men's singles, men's doubles, women's singles, and a team event consisting of one run each from men's singles, men's doubles, and women's singles.

Artificial tracks are tracks that have their curves specifically designed and banked with walled-in straightaways. Made of reinforced concrete and cooled with ammonia refrigeration, these tracks are smooth and have g-forces of up to 4g (Four times the athlete's body weight). Men's singles on most tracks have their start house close to the bobsleigh and skeleton start locations while both the men's doubles and women's singles have their start house located further down the track. As of 2009, there are sixteen bobsleigh, luge, and skeleton artificial tracks worldwide with a 17th track near Moscow that will host Junior World Cup events in November 2009. Another track in Russia near Sochi, the Sliding Center Sanki, will be in use for the 2014 Winter Olympics, had construction started in May 2009 following controversies at a previous location over track start heights and it being near World Heritage Site, including near an endangered species of brown bear.

Natural tracks are tracks adapted from existing mountain roads and paths, including a horizontal track surface and natural track icing. Most of the over 60 tracks are located in Austria, Italy, Germany, Poland, Canada, the United States, Liechtenstein, Switzerland, Croatia, Russia, Norway, Sweden, Finland, Turkey, Romania, Bulgaria, New Zealand and Slovenia.

FIL Hall of Fame
In 2004, the FIL established a Hall of Fame for the greatest competitors in luge. As of 2008, there have been a total of six inductees.

2004: Klaus Bonsack (now ), Paul Hildgartner, Margit Schumann (now )
2005: Josef Feistmantl, Hans Rinn (now )
2006: Vera Zozula (now )
2012: Gerhard Pilz, Georg Hackl (now )
2019: Armin Zöggeler

FIL Presidents
Since its founding in 1957, FIL has had three presidents, Bert Isatitsch from Austria (1957–94), Josef Fendt from Germany (1994–2020), and Einars Fogelis (2020-current) from Latvia.

Members
53 nations in June 2021:

Asia (7)
  - Chinese Luge Association
  - Indian Amateur Luge Association
  - Japan Bobsleigh and Luge Federation
  - Luge Federation of the Republic of Kazakhstan
  - Korea Luge Federation
  - Kuwait Luge Committee
  - Chinese Taipei Luge and Bobsleigh Association

Oceania (3)
  - Luge Australia Incorporated
  - New Zealand Olympic Luge Association
  - Luge Association of the Kingdom of Tonga

Americas (8)
  - Asociacion Argentina De Bobsleigh Y Skeleton- Luge
  - Bermuda Bobsled Skeleton & Luge Association
  - Confederacao Brasileira De Desportos No Gelo
  - Canadian Luge Association (Cla)
  - Virgin Islands Luge Federation
  - Puerto Rico Winter Sports Federation
  - United States Luge Association
  - Federacion Venezolana De Deportes De Invierno

Europe (35)
  - Association Andorrana De Luges Esqui Club D'Andorra
  - Österreichischer Rodelverband
  - Association Belge De Luge De Course
  - Sankaski Savez Bosne I Hercegovine
  - Bulgarian Luge Federation
  - Croatian Bobsleigh, Skeleton & Luge Federation
  - Ceskomoravska Sankarska Asociace
  - Federacion Española Deportes De Hielo
  - Estonian Association of Luge Sports
  - Suomen Kelkkailuliitto
  - Fédération Francaise Des Sports De Glace
  - Great Britain Luge Association
  - Luge Federation of the Republic of Georgia
  - Bob- Und Schlittenverband Für Deutschland (Bsd)
  - Hellenic Ice Sports Federation
  - Ungarischer Rennrodelverband
  - Irish Luge Federation
  - Federazione Italiana Sport Invernali
  - Latvian Luge Federation
  - Rodelverband Liechtenstein
  - Lithuanian Luge Federation
  - Federatia De Schi Si Sanie Din Republica Moldova
  - Bob En Slee Bond Nederland (Bsbn) C/O Nederlandse Ski Vereniging
  - Norges Ake -, Bob- Og Skeleton Forbund (Nabsf)
  - Polski Zwiazek Sportow Saneczkowych
  - FEDERAÇÃO DE DESPORTOS DE INVERNO DE PORTUGAL
  - Federatia Romana De Bob-Sanie
  - Russischer Rennrodelverband
  - Sankaska Zveza Slovenije
  - Schweizer Bobsleigh - Schlitten Und Skeleton Sportverband
  - Slovensky Zvaz Sankarov
  - Svenska Bob Och Rodelförbundet
  - Turkish Bobsleigh- Skeleton and Luge Federation
  - Rennrodelverband Der Ukraine
  - Serbia Luge Association

Championships
Results:
 Luge at the Winter Olympics
 FIL European Luge Artificial Track Championships
 FIL European Luge Natural Track Championships
 FIL World Luge Artificial Track Championships
 FIL World Luge Natural Track Championships
 World Juniors Luge Championships
 Luge World Cup
 Asian Luge Cup

References

External links
 

Sports organizations established in 1957
Luge